U.S. Route 410 (US 410) was a U.S. Highway in Washington and Idaho that existed from 1926 to 1967. It ran  from US 101 in Aberdeen, Washington, to US 95 in Lewiston, Idaho, passing through the cities of Olympia, Tacoma, Yakima, the Tri-Cities, and Walla Walla.

The highway had concurrencies with SR 8, US 99, and US 395. Even though the number indicates that US 410 was a spur of US 10, US 410 never connected with US 10, which is the same case with US 830 and US 30, although like the latter pair, they ran parallel in close proximity. When US 12 was extended into Washington in 1967, US 410 was decommissioned.

Route description
US 410 was a spur of US 10 that traveled between Aberdeen, Washington and Lewiston, Idaho.  Much of the route was renumbered to U.S. Route 12.

Washington
US 410 started at an intersection with US 101 in Aberdeen, Washington, the current western terminus of US 12. Then, US 410 went east to Olympia, where it formed a short concurrency with US 101 into Downtown Olympia. Then, US 410 followed US 99 out of Olympia and into Tacoma. In Tacoma, US 410 turned southeast and went to Sumner, through Enumclaw, and then across Chinook Pass. After going across Chinook Pass, US 410 turned east towards Pasco. In Pasco, US 410 became concurrent with US 395 and then continued east to Walla Walla. After passing Walla Walla, US 410 went into Clarkston where it crossed over the Snake River (via the Lewiston–Clarkston Bridge) into Idaho.

Idaho
After US 410 crossed the Lewiston–Clarkston Bridge over the Snake River into Idaho, the road went east and northeast to US 95, where it ended. The successor highway ("US 12") continued east to Lolo Pass and through Montana.

History

US 410 was an original U.S. Highway. It was established in 1926 and decommissioned in 1967 when US 12 was extended into Washington.

US 410 is now separated into six different highways including the concurrences with US 101 and US 99. From US 101 to Elma, Washington, US 410 became part of US 12. From Elma, Washington, to US 101 near Olympia, Washington, US 410 became SR 8. The concurrency with US 101 stayed as part of US 101 for the full length from SR 8 to US 99 (now I-5). From US 101's end to Tacoma, Washington, US 410 became part of US 99, which was replaced by I-5. From Tacoma, Washington, to Sumner, Washington, US 410 became part of SR 167. From Sumner, Washington, to Naches, Washington, US 410 retained its original number, as SR 410. From Naches, Washington, to Lewiston, Idaho, US 410 became US 12.

In 1957, the Washington State Highway Commission applied for an expansion of the Interstate Highway System to cover the entire US 410 corridor, but were rejected. A second attempt, using a tunneled route under Naches Pass, was made in 1959 and also rejected.

Major intersections

See also

References

External links

 Endpoints of U.S. Highway 410

10-4
10-4
10-4
4
10-4